Ziviyeh or Zivoyeh or Zivoyyeh may refer to:
Ziviyeh, Baneh, Kurdistan Province
Ziviyeh, Kamyaran, Kurdistan Province
Ziviyeh, Qorveh, Kurdistan Province
Ziviyeh, Saqqez, Kurdistan Province
Ziviyeh District, an administrative subdivision of Saqqez County, Kurdistan Province
Ziwiyeh, a castle in Iran